Jack Bernhard (November 28, 1914 – March 30, 1997) was an American film and television director. His films include Decoy (1946), Blonde Ice (1948), Unknown Island (1948) and The Second Face (1950).

Personal life
Bernhard was married to the British actress Jean Gillie, whom he met while serving in Britain during World War II. She appeared in his debut film Decoy. They divorced in 1947, and Gillie died in 1949. He married actress Vicki Lester in 1947; they remained married until his death in 1997.

Selected filmography

Director
Decoy (1946)
Sweetheart of Sigma Chi (1946) 
Violence (1947)
Perilous Waters (1948)
The Hunted (1948)
Blonde Ice (1948)
Unknown Island (1948)
Appointment with Murder (1948)
Alaska Patrol (1949)
Search for Danger (1949)
The Second Face (1950)

References

Bibliography
Mayer, Geoff & McDonnell, Brian. Encyclopedia of Film Noir. ABC-CLIO, 2007. .

External links

1914 births
1997 deaths
Film directors from Pennsylvania
Film producers from Pennsylvania
Businesspeople from Philadelphia
20th-century American businesspeople